Richard Parker (1729–1813) was a prominent American lawyer and judge from Westmoreland County, Virginia in the Northern Neck.

His father was Dr. Alexander Parker, a prominent physician of Essex County, Virginia.  He married Elizabeth Beale, daughter of William Beale. He was a member of the Westmoreland County Committee of Safety in 1775 and represented that county in the House of Delegates in 1778. He was appointed a judge of the general court in January 1788, in which capacity he also briefly served on the first Court of Appeals. He remained on the bench of the General Court until his death on April 4, 1813, at Lawfield, his residence in Westmoreland. One of his sons, Richard Parker (1751–1780) became a Continental Army regimental commander during the American Revolutionary War and was killed at the Siege of Charleston. A grandson, Richard E. Parker (1783–1840), was a Virginia jurist and lawyer who served briefly in the U.S. Senate.

Notes

Justices of the Supreme Court of Virginia
Virginia lawyers
Virginia state court judges
1729 births
1813 deaths
19th-century American lawyers